Hinge is a surname. Notable people with the surname include:

John Hinge (born 1986), Australian rules footballer
Lucien Hinge (born 1992), Vanuatuan footballer
Mike Hinge (1931–2003), New Zealand-born artist and illustrator
Neha Hinge, Indian model

See also
Hinge and Bracket
Hinge (disambiguation)